Hammerwood Park is a country house in Hammerwood, in the civil parish of Forest Row, in the Wealden district, in East Sussex, England. It is a Grade I listed building. One of the first houses in England to be built in the Greek Revival architectural style, it was built in 1792 as the first independent work of Benjamin Henry Latrobe. Described by Nikolaus Pevsner as a 'demonstration of primeval force', the house was owned by Led Zeppelin from 1973 until 1982.

History

The site before 1792
The land previously comprised part of a previous estate known as The Bower, probably named after a family called Atte Boure, who are listed as paying tax to Edward I in the 1290s, a substantial landholding which included parts of the parishes of East Grinstead and Hartfield. Sometime during the 1500s the owners, the Botting family, founded an iron forge to the east of the ponds in the valley to the south of the current house. The forge may have been in existence in 1558, when Hugh Botting left "two tons of yron" in his will; it was working in 1653 but ruined by 1664.

In 1693, a part of the woodland adjoining the Ashdown Forest was felled to clear the grounds of the former house on the present site. The estate, which is thought to have been part of a medieval deer park, later passed to other families and in 1766 the owner paid window tax on forty-one windows, making the Bower the fifth largest out of the 150 taxable residences in East Grinstead. It seems likely that the present Bower House, a Tudor farmhouse in the village of Hammerwood, is of no direct relation. There existed a previous building on the site of what was to become Hammerwood Lodge; foundations and walls in the west of the central block of the current house have been dated to pre-1792, and it would seem likely that this was the principal dwelling of the Bower.

1790s: design and construction

In  late 1791 or early 1792, John Sperling (1763–1851) is recorded by Christian Ignatius Latrobe as visiting architect Benjamin Henry Latrobe, his brother, in London. Sperling, who already had a country seat at Dynes Hall, a 17th-century country house and 500-acre estate in Great Maplestead, Essex, came from a wealthy family which had made its fortune in the London fur trade after emigrating from Sweden. Only a year older than Latrobe, who was at that time a pupil of S. P. Cockerell, he commissioned Latrobe to design and build a new country house and hunting lodge, in the Germanic tradition of the Jagdschloss, on the site of the Bower. Sperling chose to name the new house Hammerwood Lodge at this point, probably as a romantic reference to the hammer used in the furnace of the iron forge which had existed in the area since the Middle Ages. Latrobe is thought to have supervised the construction from the autumn of 1792 onwards, its proximity to Ashdown House, his second commission (near Forest Row) allowing for the sharing of craftsmen and suppliers of building materials – and for Latrobe to supervise both coincidentally.

Trinder describes the design as comprising "a large, Palladian central block (corps de logis) accentuated by a giant order of shallow pilasters flanked by low arcaded wings terminated in tetrastyle porticoes, while an asymmetric service wing stretches toward the northeast, hidden behind the bulk of the house." Coadeware plaques of scenes derived from the Borghese Vase adorn both porticos, and the influence of the temples at Paestum, which Latrobe may have witnessed on during prior visit to Naples, and Delos has been noted by scholars. Nikolaus Pevsner also observed that the columns were "patently inspired by the then very recent work of such men as Ledoux and Brongniart".

In 1795, due to problems in obtaining payment for another project, Latrobe was faced with severe financial problems. When his wife, Lydia Sellon, having died in childbirth in November 1793, he is thought to have suffered a breakdown. Declared bankrupt and unable to pay some of his workmen, he emigrated to America on 25 November 1795. There is some doubt over whether Hammerwood was finished by this point; it is possible that the Sperlings supervised its completion in Latrobe's absence. However, the failure of a large investment in a Dublin distillery led the Sperlings to lose £70,000 (equivalent to approximately £5.9 million in 2021 pounds); the artist and diarist Joseph Farington reported that they and their partners 'overbuilt themselves at a vast expense'. Between 1798 and 1800, Sperling was compelled to give up both Hammerwood and his London home and to move back to his Dynes Hall estate.

1800–1921: Victorian estate
In  1801, Hammerwood was purchased by Magens Dorrien Magens, a London merchant banker who served as a Tory MP for Carmarthen (for just six months in 1796; he was unseated after his opponent lodged a successful election petition) and later for Ludgershall, in Wiltshire, from 1804 to 1812. Upon his death in 1849 he left Hammerwood to his son, John Dorrien Magens, who as chairman of the board of the East Grinstead Railway Company (EGR) was responsible for the connection of East Grinstead to the railway system at Three Bridges in 1855. It would seem likely that extensions to the house, specifically to the north-east service wing, took place under the ownership of the Dorrien Magens family, and census records from the 1840s indicate at least ten indoor staff during the period.

John Dorrien Magens sold Hammerwood to Oswald Augustus Smith (1826–1902; of Smith's Bank, later part of NatWest) in June 1864 for £37,250 (equating to approximately £3.3 million in 2021 pounds), of which £10,000 was for the timber. In 1865, the Smiths contracted S. S. Teulon with the intention of remodelling the house to their taste. Amongst other more subtle changes to the building, this included raising the attic over the central block to create a low third floor, whilst preserving Latrobe's façade. Work began on 8 May 1865; scholars Snadon and Fazio comment that "Teulon integrated his additions so carefully with the existing fabric that it is difficult at first glance to discern them".

Whilst maintaining the 2,000-acre estate of parkland, arable farmland and woods, Oswald Augustus also installed a gas system for the lighting of the house, and fully insulated the newly raised roof. Initially paying for a Chapel of Ease for the three local parishes of East Grinstead, Forest Row and Hartfield, in 1873, he provided for a village school for 100 children; in 1875 for the Vicarage; in 1880 for St Stephen's Church, Hammerwood, to the design of E. P. Loftus Brock, at the cost of £7,431, the first vicar being Rev. Clement Colby Woodland of Corpus Christi College, Cambridge; in 1892 for the rebuilding of St Peter's Church, Holtye in memory of his late wife (Rose Sophia Vansittart, 1832–1892); in 1893 for the rebuilding of the Countess of Thanet's Almshouses on Holtye Common, and at the end of the 19th century for a new building for the Queen Victoria Hospital in East Grinstead. Additionally, much of the village of Hammerwood which exists today (the population of which reached a peak of 438 in 1891), and some of the houses to the east of the village of Ashurst Wood, were built during Smith's tenure as tied cottages for estate workers.

The Rev. George Ferris Whidborne (1845–1910) purchased Hammerwood from Oswald Augustus shortly before the latter's death. Impressed by the unusual and abundant wildlife, he moved his family from Dorset; the Whidbornes would live at Hammerwood from 1901 to 1921. His eldest son was killed in the First World War; all three were at different times awarded the MC.

In 1919, the prep school in Tunbridge Wells which the Whidborne children had attended burned down; St Andrew's moved to Hammerwood whilst new premises were found in Forest Row. Old boys remembered playing cricket against Ashdown House, by now a prep school, on the lawn at Hammerwood. However, in 1918 death duties had compelled Margaret Whidborne to sell 843 acres of the estate (almost half of the land). Three years later a further 1,300 acres of farms were sold, the house disposed of and the contents auctioned. Two floors of servants' quarters on the north-east service wing which had been added during the 19th century were demolished and, left with 320 acres of adjoining park and woodland, the name of the estate was changed to Hammerwood Park; its place as a focal point of local life began to decline.

1921–1982: decline and dereliction

In 1921, the remains of the estate – comprising the house and 329 acres of land – were taken up by Lt. Col. Stephen Hungerford Pollen CMG (1868–1935) after a career in the British Army, having been ADC to Lords Lansdowne and Elgin (respective Viceroys of India), winning medals for service in that country and South Africa, and serving in the Tirah Expedition in 1897. His family were the first residents to enjoy an electricity supply and water from the mains.

There remained a full complement of eleven or twelve – by differing accounts – indoor staff for the duration of the Pollens' time at Hammerwood, and he contributed the land, and a quarter of the building costs, for the building of the Hammerwood and Holtye Hall. It is a strange coincidence that one of Lt. Col. Pollen's ancestors, Richard Pollen, brother of Sir John Pollen, Bt., married the daughter of S. P. Cockerell, the architect under whom Latrobe studied. After the death of Lt. Col. Pollen in 1935, the Kirwan Taylor family bought Hammerwood; they were the owners when the Second World War broke out. Like many large houses, it was requisitioned for use by the armed forces, becoming home to 200 soldiers, including the cricketer Denis Compton, and a contingent from the Canadian Army. No. 660 Squadron RAF operated from an airstrip to the north of the park from November 1943, and the SOE flew Westland Lysanders from the same strip for a time.

After the war, John Chattell (1931–2021) bought the estate, dividing the house into eleven apartments. However, dry and wet rot became increasingly problematic and the house uninhabitable; its listed building description, written after a visit in November 1953, already noted that it was 'empty and boarded up', and placed it at Grade II status; it was later upgraded to Grade I. In 1973, rock band Led Zeppelin bought Hammerwood at auction, intending to turn it into a recording studio and flats. Although the house did make an appearance at the beginning of the film The Song Remains the Same, their plans did not progress. Amid significant vandalism, three tonnes of lead were removed from the roof, compromising it in fourteen locations and allowing thousands of gallons of water to flow into the structure. The progression of the rot accelerated, leading the house to become increasingly structurally unsafe. Hammerwood was boarded up in 1976, and put on sale in 1978.

1982–present: restoration
Having been for sale for four years, the house was advertised in Country Life in June 1982, by this time in a very poor condition and including only  30 acres of overgrown gardens. In July 1982, it was purchased by David Pinnegar, with the intention of restoring and opening it to visitors. Although there was some bemusement at his age, the house opened to the public in April 1983. The restoration,  much of which was undertaken by volunteers, won the Anne de Amodio award from the International Burgen Institute (now part of Europa Nostra) in 1984, and a silver medal from the Société d'Encouragement au Progrès in Paris in 1987. In his England's Thousand Best Houses (2003), Simon Jenkins would describe Mr Pinnegar as 'one of those eccentrics without whom half the houses in England would have vanished'.

In 1984, the house was given a rare copy of the Parthenon Frieze made by D. Brucciani & Co., which is displayed in the old kitchens, now known as the Elgin Room. The Great Storm of 1987 caused considerable damage, with No. 656 Squadron AAC assisting in a delivery of new roof lead in 1988 using a Westland Lynx, in an operation covered by Blue Peter. Except for a modest contribution by English Heritage and the Department of the Environment, private ownership restricted access to heritage grants; the restoration was instead funded almost entirely from visitors, costing more than £140,000 between 1982 and 1989, making it the largest private restoration project in Europe at the time. Works continued into the new millennium and a programme of rolling restoration is ongoing.

Hammerwood today
The house and gardens are open to visitors by guided tour in the summer and by appointment at other times. Guided tours focus upon the historical context of the house, the ancient mythological and religious origins of the Greek Revival, connections with Freemasonry, the Agricultural Revolution, the Picturesque movement, and issues of interpretation of the Borghese Vase, scenes from which are transcribed in Coade stone plaques in the porticos, and the Parthenon Frieze. An extensive musical instrument collection is used for an annual programme of concerts, and the keyboards are tuned to an unequal temperament, upon which composers of the Classical and Romantic eras relied.

The estate is used regularly as a film location for TV, feature films, fashion and photography. Films have included the 2007 horror movie Knife Edge, the 2010 film London Boulevard starring Colin Farrell and Keira Knightley, and work by Led Zeppelin, The Darkness, Victoria Beckham, Melanie C, and Cheryl Cole. It served as the setting for the 1998 narcotics documentary Sacred Weeds.

Hammerwood has also been used for fashion shoots and photography for Prada, John Lewis catalogues, Tim Walker for Vogue and editorials for other magazines (including, amongst others, Country Life). It served as the location for Beyoncé’s September 2018 Vogue cover shoot.

Park and gardens

Hammerwood is sited on a south-facing hill, commanding extensive views from the south-west to the south-east; its own southern façade looking across the valley to a stream where the iron forge which gave the estate its name once sat. A serpentine lake, artificially dammed from this steam apparently as part of the Sperlings' landscaping (not shown on a Gardner and Gream map of 1795 but visible on the OS drawing of 1808) sits at the bottom of the valley with open parkland on either side; views of distant hills continue for two or three miles beyond. Scholars Fazio and Snadon note Latrobe's 1794 reference to a 'very intimate' acquaintance with Humphry Repton (1752–1818), the English landscape designer, and suggest that many features of the Hammerwood landscape, including unobstructed views to the south which extend far further than the 1792 boundaries of the estate, align with Repton's ideas. The influence of Capability Brown has also been noted, and ring counts of oaks felled by the Great Storm of 1987 dated them to 1793 and 1796, suggesting that landscaping and replanting did indeed take place.

Additional formal terraces and informal ornamental gardens were made up in the 19th and 20th centuries, initially replacing the former sweep of parkland up to the frontage of the house shown on maps up to 1841. Oswald Augustus Smith (who purchased Hammerwood in 1864) was probably responsible for laying out the ornamental gardens to the east of the house. As the cousin of Augustus Smith (the founder of Tresco Abbey Gardens in the Isles of Scilly, where rhododendrons feature in the planting) he introduced them to Hammerwood and they remain today. The Smiths also planted the gardens with specimen trees and made up gravel paths through the bushes, shrubberies and woodland to the east (these are shown on the OS map of 1873). In 1927, a Yew Garden was introduced below the south terrace; it has been restored and is now a registered helicopter landing site. Until the mid-20th century, the parkland on the valley slopes to the south of the lakes was mainly wooded; it is now under arable cultivation, for which it was largely cleared of trees in the 1950s. A few scattered trees remain from the extensive pattern shown established on the map of 1808.

During the period of dereliction much of the garden (including kitchen gardens and greenhouses to the north) became severely overgrown, and the parkland was used as grazing land (with the Library employed as a grain store). Much of the ornamental garden to the south and east has been restored and replanted, with work done by volunteers from the National Trust Activities Group (NTAG) and the London Wildlife Trust (and, in the replanting of trees, by the Stanley Smith Horticultural Trust, the Men of the Trees, the Countryside Commission and the South East Electricity Board after the Great Storm of 1987). Forming part of the High Weald AONB since October 1983, the parkland and gardens were given Grade II listed status in 1987.

Entrances and approaches
As part of the landscaping undertaken by Sperling and Latrobe in the 1790s, a long, winding drive extending from Ashurst Wood which approached the house from the south was laid. In his study of Hammerwood, Trinder suggests that from the perspective created by this approach the pilasters on the central block create an optical illusion which leads the house to look larger than it is due to the inclusion of temple fronts on the wings. He describes the joint endeavours of Sperling and Latrobe as "a collective ego trip on a small budget ... the house, although of modest size for the time, is designed to look huge." From the mid-19th century (probably coincidental with John Dorrien-Magens' development of the railway from East Grinstead), the southerly approach became less oft-used as the route from the railway town became more practical via the East Grinstead–Tunbridge Wells road (which was to become the B2110, and then the A264) and the lane thence through the village of Hammerwood.

The southerly approach fell almost entirely out of use as the house became derelict, and some of it was given over to farmland in the 20th century; more recently the drive has been obstructed by hedges along its length. The former entrance lodge, known as Dog Gate Lodge, survives, together with the bridge (at the site of the earlier iron forge) which carried the drive over the feeder channel for the ornamental lake at the foot of the valley. The road leading east out of Ashurst Wood (now a dead end) is still called Hammerwood Road. There were also two secondary entrance drives to the house, from the north-west and north-east, now disused but shown on the tithe map of 1841.

References

External links
Hammerwood Park website

Benjamin Henry Latrobe buildings and structures
Country houses in East Sussex
East Grinstead
Grade II listed parks and gardens in East Sussex
Greek Revival houses in the United Kingdom
Grade I listed buildings in East Sussex
Grade I listed houses
Historic house museums in East Sussex
Houses completed in 1795
Led Zeppelin
Palladian architecture